Mari Kurismaa (born 19 April 1956 in Pärnu) is an Estonian interior architect and painter.

In 1979 she graduated from Estonian State Art Institute in interior architecture.

1980s and 1990s she was focused on painting. In the late 1990s he focused again on interior architecture. Since 2002 she is working at OÜ Stuudio Kurismaa.

Since 1987 she is a member of Estonian Artists' Union. She is married to artist Kaarel Kurismaa.

Awards
 1997, 2004 and 2015: annual prize of Estonian Cultural Endowment

Works

 1997: renovation of the hall of Riigikogu (group work)
 2002-2003: interior works for Estonian Drama Theatre (with the group Koldegrupp)

References

External links
 

Living people
1956 births
Estonian women architects
Estonian women painters
20th-century Estonian painters
21st-century Estonian painters
Estonian Academy of Arts alumni
People from Pärnu